Kristina Ugarova (nee Khaleyeva; born October 22, 1987) is a Russian middle distance runner. She holds best of 4:00.53 minutes for the 1500 meters and 2:00.38 minutes for the 800 meters.

Doping
On 29 November 2016, the Court of Arbitration for Sport (CAS) banned Ugarova from competition, along with Tatyana Chernova and Ekaterina Sharmina. CAS stated, "All three athletes have been found to have committed an anti-doping rule violation - of the International Athletic Association Federation (IAAF) Competition Rules after analysis of their Athlete Biological Passports (ABP) showed evidence of blood doping."

International
Ugarova competed in athletics at the 2012 Summer Olympics. She was awarded the bronze medal in the women's 1500 metres at the 2015 Summer Universiade before analysis found evidence of doping. Ugarova's times improved from 2:03 to 2:00 and 4:08 to 4:00 in three years from 2009-12.

References

External links

Kristina Ugarova European athletics profile

Living people
1987 births
Russian female middle-distance runners
Russian sportspeople in doping cases
Universiade medalists in athletics (track and field)
Universiade bronze medalists for Russia
Medalists at the 2015 Summer Universiade